Solariella basilica is a species of sea snail, a marine gastropod mollusk in the family Solariellidae. This marine species is endemic to New Zealand and occurs off Three Kings Islands at a depth of 55 m.

References

External links
 Marshall B.A. (1999). A revision of the Recent Solariellinae (Gastropoda: Trochoidea) of the New Zealand region. The Nautilus 113(1): 4-42

basilicum
Gastropods of New Zealand
Gastropods described in 1999